Treubia is a genus of liverworts in the family Treubiaceae.  There are seven species, all of which are restricted to the southern hemisphere. Five of the species occur in Australasia and the other (Treubia scapanioides) occurs in Chile.  All species are dioicous, with separate male and female gametophytes.

Classification
Species list:
 Treubia insignis K.I.Goebel
 Treubia lacunosa (Colenso) Prosk.
 Treubia lacunosoides T.Pfeiff., W.Frey et M.Stech
 Treubia pygmaea R.M.Schust.
 Treubia scapanioides R.M.Schust.
 Treubia tahitensis (Nadeaud) Goebel ex Besch.
 Treubia tasmanica R.M.Schust. et G.A.M.Scott

References 

Treubiales
Liverwort genera